Nellaya  is a village in Palakkad district in the state of Kerala, India. The village has its own gram panchayat.

Demographics
 India census, Nellaya had a population of 32,056 with 15,128 males and 16,928 females.

Elected Members 2021-2025

Former Presidents

See also
Ezhuvanthala

References

Villages in Palakkad district
Gram panchayats in Palakkad district